János Teleszky (15 September 1868 – 13 June 1939) was a Hungarian politician, who served as Minister of Finance between 1912 and 1917. He was full member of the Hungarian Academy of Sciences. After the First World War he served as chairman of the National Financial Council. The creating of the superannuation act and formation of the Pénzintézeti Központ are connected his name.

References
 Magyar Életrajzi Lexikon

1868 births
1939 deaths
People from Oradea
Jewish Hungarian politicians
Finance ministers of Hungary